Karl Hill may refer to:

 Karl Hill (183193), German baritone opera singer
 Karl Hill (musician) (born 1975), British-American rock and roll guitarist and drummer, member of Government Issue

See also 
 Hill (surname)